Zoltan Sabo (26 May 1972 – 15 December 2020) was a Serbian professional footballer who played as a defender, and later manager. He also held Hungarian citizenship.

Playing career
In his homeland, Sabo played for Hajduk Kula, Vojvodina, and Partizan, before moving abroad to South Korea and signing for Suwon Samsung Bluewings in early 2000. He left the club after two years to play for Japanese side Avispa Fukuoka. In early 2003, Sabo returned to Europe and joined Hungarian club Zalaegerszeg until the end of the season. He also played for AEK Larnaca in the 2003–04 campaign.

In 2004, he returned to Serbia and signed with second-tier side Mladost Apatin. He finished his playing career in third-tier side Cement Beočin.

Managerial career
After a stint as assistant manager to Tomislav Sivić at Kecskemét, Sabo began his managerial career at the helm of his hometown club Radnički Sombor in October 2009. He spent the next two years at the position before leaving the side in November 2011. A month later, Sabo was appointed manager at Hajduk Kula.

Death
Sabo died on 15 December 2020, aged 48, died of a heart attack.

Honours
Partizan
 First League of FR Yugoslavia: 1996–97, 1998–99
 FR Yugoslavia Cup: 1997–98
Suwon Samsung Bluewings
 Asian Club Championship: 2000–01, 2001–02
 Asian Super Cup: 2001
 Korean League Cup: 2000, 2001
 Korean Super Cup: 2000
AEK Larnaca
 Cypriot Cup: 2003–04

References

External links
 Srbijafudbal profile
 
 
 

1972 births
2020 deaths
Association football defenders
AEK Larnaca FC players
Avispa Fukuoka players
Cypriot First Division players
Expatriate footballers in Cyprus
Expatriate footballers in Hungary
Expatriate footballers in Japan
Expatriate footballers in South Korea
First League of Serbia and Montenegro players
FK Hajduk Kula managers
FK Hajduk Kula players
FK Jagodina managers
FK Partizan players
FK Vojvodina players
FK Mladost Apatin players
Hungarian football managers
Hungarian footballers
J2 League players
K League 1 players
Nemzeti Bajnokság I players
Serbian SuperLiga managers
Serbia and Montenegro expatriate footballers
Serbia and Montenegro expatriate sportspeople in Cyprus
Serbia and Montenegro expatriate sportspeople in Hungary
Serbia and Montenegro expatriate sportspeople in Japan
Serbia and Montenegro expatriate sportspeople in South Korea
Serbia and Montenegro footballers
Serbian football managers
Serbian footballers
Serbian people of Hungarian descent
Sportspeople from Sombor
Suwon Samsung Bluewings players
Zalaegerszegi TE players
FK Cement Beočin players
FK TSC Bačka Topola managers
Deaths from the COVID-19 pandemic in Serbia